Thielle-Wavre is a former municipality in the district of Neuchâtel in the Swiss canton of Neuchâtel.  On 1 January 2009, Marin-Epagnier and Thielle-Wavre merged to form the new municipality of La Tène.

The hamlet of Montmirail lies within the territory of Thielle-Wavre.

References

Former municipalities of the canton of Neuchâtel